Standfussiana wiskotti is a moth of the family Noctuidae. It is only found above the tree-line in the Alps in Switzerland, France, Italy and Austria. It is found to heights of up to 3,500 meters.

The wingspan is 35–44 mm. The moth flies from July to August depending on the location.

The larvae feed on various herbaceous plants.

External links
 www.lepiforum.de
 www.nic.funet.fi
 Fauna Europaea

Noctuinae
Moths of Europe
Moths described in 1888